"Me" is a song written, produced, and performed by American singer-songwriter Paula Cole. It was released as the third and final single from her second studio album, This Fire (1996), in February 1998. Released only to radio, the song entered the top 40 on the US Billboard Hot 100 Airplay chart and peaked at number 17 on the Billboard Adult Top 40. In Canada, the song reached number 20 on the RPM Top Singles chart. A promotional CD was also issued in Germany.

Track listings
US promo HDCD
 "Me" (radio edit) – 3:36
 "Me" (album version) – 5:00

German promo CD
 "Me" (radio edit) – 3:36

Charts

Weekly charts

Year-end charts

Release history

References

1998 singles
1998 songs
Imago Records singles
Paula Cole songs
Songs written by Paula Cole
Warner Records singles